Italia Almirante Manzini (3 June 1890 – 15 September 1941) was an Italian actress of the silent film era. She appeared in more than fifty films from 1911 to 1934.

Biography 
She was born to Michele and actress Urania Dell'Este. Her paternal uncle was Nunzio Almirante, father of Mario (in turn father of politician Giorgio), Ernesto, Giacomo and Luigi. She married the journalist writer Amerigo Manzini when she was still young, and alongside him she acted on various occasions, both in theater and film.

Selected filmography

References

External links 

1890 births
1941 deaths
Italian film actresses
Italian silent film actresses
20th-century Italian actresses
Italian stage actresses
People from Taranto
Italian emigrants to Brazil
Burials at Campo Verano
Deaths due to insect bites and stings